Sainte-Barbe Library (French: Bibliothèque Sainte-Barbe) is an inter-university library in Paris, France, that opened in March 2009.
It is located in the buildings of the former College of St. Barbara, and has been registered as a historical monument from 9 December 1999.

History

The College of St. Barbara was founded in 1460 by Geoffrey Lenormant. 
Directed by Ernest Lheureux, a pupil of Theodore Labrouste, construction of the Chartière and Valette buildings was undertaken between 1881 and 1884. 
Dating from 1936, the construction of the Écosse (Scotland) wing by Daniel Lionel and Raoul Brandon was completed in 1939.

The transformation of Santa Barbara library is part of the U3M (Universities for the Third Millennium) plan, a program for development of higher education and research in the Ile-de-France.
Formally established by Decree No. 2004-1121 of 14 October 2004, 
the inter-university library of St. Barbara is administratively attached to the University of Paris III: Sorbonne Nouvelle, and a preparatory team worked 60 rue de Wattignies (Paris 12) between 2001 and 2008.

In February 2008, the team settled permanently in the premises of the College Sainte-Barbe located at 4 rue Valette (Paris 5), renovated by the architect Antoine Stinco. 
Open to the public since 9 March 2009, it shares a portion of its premises with the library of the Sorbonne from May 2010 during its renovation.

Purpose

Primarily aimed at undergraduates, the library complements other university libraries in the Latin Quarter. 
Situated in the immediate vicinity of the Sainte-Geneviève and Cujas libraries, Sainte-Barbe offers everyone open access to collections on law, economics, social sciences, languages, literature and arts. 
Its collections, strongly oriented to help students succeed in the beginning of the course, are complementary to those of its illustrious neighbors.

Operation

Open from 10am to 8pm from Monday to Saturday, the library serves undergraduates and students of Masters courses at public universities in Paris and the Ile de France, 
with a potential readership of 100,000 students.
To this should be added students in preparatory classes to the grandes ecoles.

Amenities

800 working places equipped with electrical outlets for laptops
200 computer workstations providing access to databases and online periodicals, with office tools, catalogs and Internet access
40 computers available on loan
120,000 volumes with open access and available on loan
collections fully equipped with RFID technology, which automates lending and returns
rooms for group work (50 seats total)
a reading room for the French and foreign daily press
two reading rooms for the library of the Sorbonne during its renovation.
The entire building is accessible to disabled people. All print and electronic collections is accessible to the visually impaired and blind.

References

Libraries in Paris
2009 establishments in France
Libraries established in 2009